Wookey is a village and civil parish  west of Wells, on the River Axe in the Mendip district of Somerset, England. The parish includes the village of Henton and the nearby hamlets of Yarley and Bleadney where the River Axe travels the length of the village. There used to be a port at Bleadney on the river in the 8th century which allowed goods to be brought to within  of Wells.
Wookey is often confused with its sister village Wookey Hole (2 miles to the north), site of the Wookey Hole Caves.

History
The name Wookey is thought to come from the Old English wocig, meaning an animal trap. An alternative explanation has been offered which suggests it comes from the Celtic word ogof meaning cave, possibly appearing also as Woky

One mile north-west of Polsham, but within the parish of Wookey are the earthwork remains of Fenny Castle, a motte and bailey castle sited on a natural hillock.

The parish was part of the hundred of Wells Forum.

The now-closed Wookey Station, once lying on Cheddar Valley line branch of the Bristol and Exeter Railway, is a geological Site of Special Scientific Interest.

The village included a manor house built by Bishop Jocelin of Wells in the 13th century. It was rebuilt in the sixteenth century and is now a farmhouse and Grade II* listed building.

The population in 1821 was 1,040, comprising 223 families, of which 147 were employed in agriculture.

The National School was founded in the village in 1844 by St Matthew's Church. From October to December 1880, H. G. Wells joined the school as a pupil-teacher aged 12, following a relative who was headteacher at that time.
It later became Wookey Primary School, a community primary for around 85 children aged 4 to 11 of Wookey and the surrounding area.

Governance

The parish council has responsibility for local issues, including setting an annual precept (local rate) to cover the council's operating costs and producing annual accounts for public scrutiny. The parish council evaluates local planning applications and works with the local police, district council officers, and neighbourhood watch groups on matters of crime, security, and traffic. The parish council's role also includes initiating projects for the maintenance and repair of parish facilities, as well as consulting with the district council on the maintenance, repair, and improvement of highways, drainage, footpaths, public transport, and street cleaning. Conservation matters (including trees and listed buildings) and environmental issues are also the responsibility of the council.

The village falls within the Non-metropolitan district of Mendip, which was formed on 1 April 1974 under the Local Government Act 1972, having previously been part of Wells Rural District, which is responsible for local planning and building control, local roads, council housing, environmental health, markets and fairs, refuse collection and recycling, cemeteries and crematoria, leisure services, parks, and tourism.

Somerset County Council is responsible for running the largest and most expensive local services such as education, social services, libraries, main roads, public transport, policing and fire services, trading standards, waste disposal and strategic planning.

The village falls within the 'Wookey and St Cuthbert Out West' electoral ward. The ward starts near Wells and stretches via St Cuthbert Out to Godney. The total population of this ward taken from the 2011 census was 2,510.

It is also part of the Wells county constituency represented in the House of Commons of the Parliament of the United Kingdom. It elects one Member of Parliament (MP) by the first past the post system of election.

Religious sites

St Matthew's church dates from the twelfth century and is a Grade I listed building. It was granted to the dean of Wells by Bishop Robert, rebuilt by Bishop Reginald and assigned to the sub dean of the cathedral in 1209. The south chancel is thought to have been built to house the memorial to Thomas Clerke in 1556. Beside the church stands the Mellifont Abbey, which was once home to Sir Jacob Wolff, 1st Baronet, where a monument to him and his wife can be seen in the church. Mellifont Abbey is named after the abbey of the same name in Ireland.

Notable residents

Wookey was the birthplace of the trade unionist A.J. Cook, and of Sir Arthur Pearson, the publisher and philanthropist.

References

External links

Wookey parish website

Villages in Mendip District
Somerset Levels
Civil parishes in Somerset